Labor Studies Journal is a quarterly peer-reviewed academic journal covering research in the field of labor studies. Its editors-in-chief are Michelle Kaminski (Michigan State University) and Robert Bruno (University of Illinois). It was established in 1998 and is published by SAGE Publications on behalf of the United Association for Labor Education.

Abstracting and indexing 
The journal is abstracted and indexed in Scopus and Sociological Abstracts.

External links
 

Labour journals
Quarterly journals
SAGE Publishing academic journals
Publications established in 1998
English-language journals